This is a list of electoral divisions and wards in the ceremonial county of Northumberland in North East England. All changes since the re-organisation of local government following the passing of the Local Government Act 1972 are shown. The number of councillors elected for each electoral division or ward is shown in brackets.

County council

Northumberland
Electoral Divisions from 1 April 1974 (first election 12 April 1973) to 7 May 1981:

Electoral Divisions from 7 May 1981 to 7 June 2001:

Electoral Divisions from 7 June 2001 to 2 May 2013:

Electoral Divisions from 2 May 2013 to present:

Former district councils

Alnwick
Wards from 1 April 1974 (first election 7 June 1973) to 3 May 1979:

Wards from 3 May 1979 to 6 May 1999:

Wards from 6 May 1999 to 1 April 2009 (district abolished):

Berwick-upon-Tweed
Wards from 1 April 1974 (first election 7 June 1973) to 6 May 1976:

Wards from 6 May 1976 to 6 May 1999:

Wards from 6 May 1999 to 1 April 2009 (district abolished):

† minor boundary changes in 2008 ????

Blyth Valley
Wards from 1 April 1974 (first election 7 June 1973) to 3 May 1979:

Wards from 3 May 1979 to 2 May 1991:

Wards from 2 May 1991 to 6 May 1999:

Wards from 6 May 1999 to 1 April 2009 (district abolished):

Castle Morpeth
Wards from 1 April 1974 (first election 7 June 1973) to 6 May 1976:

Wards from 6 May 1976 to 6 May 1999:

Wards from 6 May 1999 to 3 May 2007:

Wards from 3 May 2007 to 1 April 2009 (district abolished):

Tynedale
Wards from 1 April 1974 (first election 7 June 1973) to 6 May 1976:

Wards from 6 May 1976 to 6 May 1999:

Wards from 6 May 1999 to 1 April 2009 (district abolished):

Wansbeck
Wards from 1 April 1974 (first election 7 June 1973) to 6 May 1976:

Wards from 6 May 1976 to 6 May 1999:

Wards from 6 May 1999 to 3 May 2007:

Wards from 3 May 2007 to 1 April 2009 (district abolished):

Electoral wards by constituency

Berwick-upon-Tweed
Alnmouth and Lesbury, Alnwick Castle, Alnwick Clayport, Alnwick Hotspur, Amble Central, Amble East, Amble West, Bamburgh, Beadnell, Belford, Chevington, Cheviot, Edward, Elizabeth, Ellington, Embleton, Flodden, Ford, Harbottle and Elsdon, Hartburn, Hedgeley, Islandshire, Longframlington, Longhorsley, Longhoughton with Craster and Rennington, Lowick, Lynemouth, Norhamshire, North Sunderland, Prior, Rothbury and South Rural, Seton, Shielfield, Shilbottle, Spittal, Ulgham, Warkworth, Whittingham, Wooler.

Blyth Valley
Cowpen, Cramlington East, Cramlington Eastfield, Cramlington North, Cramlington South East, Cramlington Village, Cramlington West, Croft, Hartley, Holywell, Isabella, Kitty Brewster, Newsham and New Delaval, Plessey, Seaton Delaval, Seghill, South Beach, South Newsham, Wensleydale.

Hexham
Acomb, Allendale, Bellingham, Broomhaugh and Riding, Chollerton with Whittington, Corbridge, East Tynedale, Hadrian, Haltwhistle, Haydon, Heddon-on-the-Wall, Hexham Gilesgate, Hexham Hencotes, Hexham Leazes, Hexham Priestpopple, Humshaugh and Wall, Ovingham, Ponteland East, Ponteland North, Ponteland South, Ponteland West, Prudhoe Castle, Prudhoe North, Prudhoe South, Prudhoe West, Redesdale, Sandhoe with Dilston, Slaley and Hexhamshire, South Tynedale, Stamfordham, Stannington, Stocksfield with Mickley, Upper North Tyne, Wanney, Warden and Newbrough, Wark, West Tynedale, Wylam.

Wansbeck
Bedlington Central, Bedlington East, Bedlington West, Bothal, Central, Choppington, College, Guide Post, Haydon, Hebron, Hepscott and Mitford, Hirst, Morpeth Central, Morpeth Kirkhill, Morpeth North, Morpeth South, Morpeth Stobhill, Newbiggin East, Newbiggin West, Park, Pegswood, Seaton, Sleekburn, Stakeford.

See also
List of parliamentary constituencies in Northumberland

References

Politics of Northumberland
Northumberland